ASDS may refer to:

Autonomous spaceport drone ship, a mobile rocket landing platform
Advanced SEAL Delivery System, a former U.S. submarine